Scott McKinsey (born April 16, 1959) is an American television soap opera director.

Family
McKinsey is the son of late actress Beverlee McKinsey, who was known for long-running roles on Another World  and Guiding Light.

Directing Credits
 As the World Turns (2001–2002)
 Days of Our Lives (2015–present)
 General Hospital (1992–2001, 2002–2020)
 General Hospital: Night Shift (2007)
 Guarding Eddy (2004)
 Guiding Light (1986–1991)
 Miss Behave (2012)
 Port Charles (1997–2001, 2002–2003)
 Search for Tomorrow (early 1980s)
 Valley of the Dolls (1994)
 The Young and the Restless (2017–2018)

Awards and nominations

Daytime Emmy Awards
Wins
 1983: Outstanding Film Editing in Children's Programming – CBS Schoolbreak Special – (Episode: "The Shooting")
 1983: Outstanding Individual Achievement in Religious Programming - Film Editing – Insight
 2000, 2004–2006, 2010, 2012, 2016–2017: Outstanding Drama Series Directing Team – General Hospital
 2018: Outstanding Drama Series Directing Team - Days Of Our Lives

Nominations
 1990–1991: Outstanding Drama Series Directing Team – Guiding Light
 1996–1999, 2007–2008, 2011, 2015, 2018-2019: Outstanding Drama Series Directing Team – General Hospital
 2003: Outstanding Drama Series Directing Team – As the World Turns
 2017–2020: Outstanding Directing Team for a Drama Series – Days Of Our Lives.

Directors Guild of America Awards
Wins 
 1997: Outstanding Directorial Achievement in Daytime Serials – General Hospital – (Episode #8883)
 2002: Outstanding Directorial Achievement in Daytime Serials – Port Charles – (Episode #1433)

Nominations
 1995: Outstanding Directorial Achievement in Serials - Daytime – General Hospital – (Episode #8233) (Shared with Shelley Curtis)
 1996: Outstanding Directorial Achievement in Serials - Daytime – General Hospital – (Episode #8492)
 2006: Outstanding Directorial Achievement in Daytime Serials – General Hospital – (Episode #11178)
 2007: Outstanding Directorial Achievement in Daytime Serials – General Hospital – (Episode #11228)
 2011: Outstanding Directorial Achievement in Daytime Serials – General Hospital – (Episode: "Forces of Nature")
 2012: Outstanding Directorial Achievement in Daytime Serials – General Hospital – (Episode: "Shot Through the Heart")

References

External links

Official ABC-TV: GH

American television directors
Living people
1959 births
Directors Guild of America Award winners
Daytime Emmy Award winners